This article is an incomplete outline of terrorist incidents in Pakistan in 2019 in chronological order.

January
 5 January - Six people, including two women, were injured in an improvised explosive device (IED) blast in Peshawar. The IED was planted in a car parked next to Sunehri Masjid in Peshawar Cantonment.
 6 January - At least nine people were injured in an IED blast in Jan Adda area of Pishin District. The IED planted in a motorcycle targeted a Balochistan Levies vehicle. Another two people, including a security man, were injured in a motorcycle blast near a Frontier Corps vehicle in Panjgur.
 9 January - A Karachi-Islamabad RLNG pipeline was targeted by a timed explosive device near Bhong in Rahim Yar Khan District. No casualties were reported as a result of the incident.
 29 January -  January 2019 Loralai attack - 9 people including 8 policemen and a civilian were killed while 22 others were injured when gunmen and suicide bombers attacked a Deputy Inspector General's (DIG) office. The Tehrik-i-Taliban claimed responsibility for the attack.

February
16 February - February 2019 Balochistan attacks
18 April - 2019 Makran Massacre

April
12 April - 2019 Quetta attack

May
 8 May - At least 13 people were Killed in a 2019 Lahore bombing suicide attack outside Data Darbar in Lahore.
 21 May - At least 5 people were Killed in an attack on Pearl Continental Hotel in port city Quetta.

July 
 21 July - At least seven people were killed in a suicide attack at a hospital in Dera Ismail Khan.

References

External links
 South Asia Terrorism Portal

 
Pakistan
2019